The Fairmount neighborhood is located within the West Duluth district of Duluth, Minnesota, United States.

Grand Avenue serves as a main route in the community.

Duluth's Lake Superior Zoo is located within the Fairmount neighborhood at 72nd Avenue West and Grand Avenue.

The neighborhood is located between Keene Creek and Kingsbury Creek.

Keene Creek Dog Park is located at the eastern edge of the Fairmount neighborhood.

Adjacent Neighborhoods

(Directions following those of Duluth's general street grid system, not actual geographical coordinates)

Cody (north)
Norton Park (south, west)
Irving (east)

External links and references
City of Duluth website
City map of neighborhoods (PDF)
Duluth's Lake Superior Zoo website

Duluth–Superior metropolitan area
Neighborhoods in Duluth, Minnesota